The Norton Model 7 Dominator was a 500 cc  vertical twin motorcycle manufactured by the Norton Motorcycle Company from 1949 to 1955. It was the first of Norton's Dominator range of motorcycles. The engine was designed by Bert Hopwood and was a departure from Norton's previous practice of producing single-cylinder machines. The Model 7 was used in Japan as a police motorcycle.

Background
In post-WW2 Britain, motorcycle manufacturers were getting back to production of civilian machines following the production of military machines. The British Government had launched an 'Export or Die' campaign to aid the economic recovery from war. Triumph's 1937 Speed twin had been well received and other manufacturers started to design their own 500 cc twins.

Having worked under designers Val Page at Ariel and Edward Turner at Triumph, where he assisted with the design of the Triumph Speed Twin, Hopwood was poached by Norton to design a new twin engine.

The new Model 7 Dominator, using Hopwood's engine in Norton ES2 cycle parts, was launched at the November 1948 Earls Court Motorcycle Show.

Technical details

Engine and transmission

The engine had a 360-degree built up crankshaft with central flywheels. This arrangement meant that a central main bearing could not be fitted. The outer main bearings were of ball bearing on the timing side and roller bearings on the drive side. Alloy conrods were split at the big end and used a bush for the big end bearing. The camshaft was fitted in front of the engine, driven by a chain off a half-speed pinion. For ignition, a Lucas magneto was fitted at the rear of the engine, and to supply power for the lights a dynamo was fitted at the front of the engine. Both were driven by chains.

The cylinder block was in cast iron and had an integral push rod tube. Cast iron was also used for the cylinder head, which had cast-in rocker boxes to eliminate potential oil leaks between head and rocker boxes. A shallow combustion chamber, combined with low included-angle valve configuration and flat top pistons gave a good swirl effect. The head had widely splayed exhaust ports to aid cooling. A single Amal carburettor fed fuel to the engine through an alloy manifold. On the show model, the manifold was part of the head casting.

The engine used a traditional long stroke with a bore and stroke of  x  and produced  at 6,000 rpm.

An alloy cylinder head was introduced in 1954.

Primary drive was by chain to a wet clutch and was enclosed in a pressed steel chaincase. To fit in the ES2 frame, a new 4 speed "lay-down" gearbox was fitted. Final drive was by chain.

Cycle parts
The Model 7 used the cycle parts of the single cylinder ES2, which used Norton's 'garden gate' plunger frame and long 'road holder' forks. Brakes were single width  drum brakes front and rear. Although the Model 7 engine had been fitted into the swinging arm 'featherbed frame' to produce the lighter and better handling Model 88 in 1952, production of the Model 7 continued as the featherbed was thought to be unsuitable for sidecar use.

A new rear sub-frame was designed by development engineer Bob Collier in 1953, giving the bike swinging arm rear suspension and a larger  front brake was fitted in 1954.

Australian models
Norton' factory records show that the initial production of the Model 7 was for Australia. At the August 1950 Brisbane show, Australia's annual motorcycle show, a rigid framed version of the Model 7 was shown on the stand of Andersons Agencies, an Australian Norton dealer. (Bob Collier of Norton's experimental department had produced a prototype rigid framed model for the 1950 racing season.) The rigid model was promoted as being  lower and  lighter than the plunger version. The rigid model was known variously as the 'Model 77', 'Model 77 Sport Twin', 'Dominator Rigid' and the 'Dominator Rigid Sport'. Factory records show that 237 rigid machines were sent to Australia between April 1950 and February 1952.

References

External links

 
 

Norton motorcycles
Motorcycles introduced in 1949
Motorcycles powered by straight-twin engines